Wietecha may refer to:

 Ray Wietecha (1928–2002), American footballer
 Tomasz Wietecha (born 1978), Polish footballer